Philip Brooke Barnes (15 June 1926 – 27 July 2009) was a pioneer of cultural travel who did much to foster understanding of different cultures among more than 80,000 participants who signed up for his tours and the hundreds of scholars and projects he supported over five decades. In 1958, he founded the Association for Cultural Exchange (ACE Foundation), an innovative educational trust which promoted in-depth learning about different cultures. Barnes believed that a deeper understanding others cultures and societies was an essential for improving international relations. A view that was informed  from his experience in World War II and the early post-war environment.

Biography

Early life and education
Barnes's father, George Brooke Barnes, died when he was 4, and young Philip, an only child, moved with his mother to Clacton-on-Sea, Essex. In 1939 they were instructed to move to Chelmsford due to the fear of invasion after the outbreak of the Second World War. He began work as a junior clerk, aged 16, in a firm of chartered accountants and started an economics degree at Birkbeck College, University of London, while still working. In 1945 he was called up and served in military intelligence for more than three years, working in the Middle East and in India, where he first developed his great love of the sub-continent's culture. On his return, Barnes finished his economics degree at the London School of Economics, then read philosophy at Jesus College, Cambridge. The environs of Cambridge and trips to Scandinavia were very influential not only on his personal life but also for the shaping of the ACE. His determination brooked few obstacles, including those to travel in remote places in the 1950s and 1960s, when few of the comforts that tourists now take for granted were available.

Career
In the late 1940s Barnes worked as a waiter in the US, and for a water company in Norway, long before the gap year had been invented. His first professional job after graduating was as a reporter for Reuters, posted to Denmark. He became student of its medieval and renaissance history. Denmark's adult education movement inspired him to devise courses in England for Scandinavian teachers to study English life, culture and language. On one of these he met Inger Kragh: they married in 1962.

In 1958 Barnes founded the Association for Cultural Exchange (now called ACE Foundation). Barnes supported it for ten years, working as a supply teacher and then as managing director of a firm that produced the Haverhill Echo and Liberal News. Tony Crowe and James Hockey of the Farnham School of Art were founding members of the organisation, as well as John Davies Evans of the Institute of Archaeology at London University. ACE was a pioneer when currency restrictions hampered international travel. In its first year a summer course at Exeter College, Oxford, for Scandinavian teachers was addressed by Clement Attlee.

In its first three years the ACE also maintained a residential centre in the Suffolk village of Clare, housed in two redundant pubs. But Barnes soon eschewed the challenges of maintaining such a centre in favour of peripatetic courses emphasising travel, although he continued to run summer schools at Oxford for two decades. Courses were held in the UK and in Europe specifically for Americans, in European art and architecture, and for the English in the US, in American history and civilisation, notably at Ripon College in Wisconsin, 1959–60. Courses were also arranged for the University of Pittsburgh, as well as in Denmark and in Wales, examining the search for identity in modern democracies, and work in a free society, both well ahead of their time.

Study tours of Denmark included visits to stately and royal homes. On one occasion, a tour group was asked to be particularly punctual for a visit to the Royal Summer Palace at Sofiero, Sweden. There they were received at the door by Gustaf VI Adolf of Sweden himself, then in his 80s, who showed the visitors around personally.

His passion for India led to scores of trips, initiated long before the hippy trail and at a time when international cultural travel to the sub-continent hardly existed. He started running tours to Mexico in 1974, Iran in 1975 and Peru in 1977.

The ACE also sponsored archaeological digs, some of international importance, (notably at Oronsay in the Inner Hebrides) which have taught both amateurs and professionals; and 28 years of fellowships at UCL's Institute of Archaeology. In recent years subsidised British archaeologists have taught the techniques of aerial archaeology to newly liberated ex-communist countries, which in previous years could not have countenanced any form of aerial surveillance. At a time when the British were still uncomfortable and ill at ease with the notion of German culture, ACE led the way in specialist tours of Baroque and Rococo Teutonic achievements.

Other early tours focused on Islamic Spain, the culture of China and the natural flora and fauna of New Zealand. He pressed on with cultural tours to Bolivia despite the revolutions and roadblocks so frequently encountered in that volatile country. Undaunted, his charity organised a cultural tour to Algeria in 2009, another first.

Music festivals internationally and at home figured largely, as did trips to the Middle East, the Horn of Africa, and the countries of South East Asia, including early visits to Cambodia when it reopened its borders to the outside world.

As well as sustaining hundreds of study courses, the association's growing endowment fund supported scholarships for foreigners to study conservation and heritage methodology in Britain, archaeological fellowships, bursaries for overseas postgraduate students for the universities of York and Cambridge, a school in South Africa, street children in Addis Ababa and women's village education in India.

In the early 1990s Barnes assumed a supervisory role, retiring from active tour leading, and was to hand over the role of managing director to his son Hugh. His son Paul later replaced him as charity secretary.

Over five decades there were about 85,000 participants, 4,000 tours worldwide, 90 countries visited and hundreds of lecturers engaged.

References

External links
Guardian Obituary* 
Times Obituary* 
Independent Obituary* 
ACE Foundation* 
ACE Study Tours* 

1926 births
2009 deaths
Alumni of the London School of Economics
Alumni of Jesus College, Cambridge
English philanthropists
20th-century British philanthropists